Ophichthus limkouensis is an eel in the family Ophichthidae (worm/snake eels). It was described by Johnson T. F. Chen in 1929. It is a marine, tropical eel which is known from the western central Pacific Ocean.

References

limkouensis
Fish described in 1929